Salendine Nook High School Academy is a large secondary school in Huddersfield, West Yorkshire, England. It is adjacent to Huddersfield New College.

When the school was built, Huddersfield Corporation had a trolleybus terminus built next to it, serving only for the journeys of the school's pupils. This provision was unique in the British Isles.

The school formally became an academy on 1 February 2012. This followed a resolution to seek academy status by the school governors at governors meeting on 6 July 2011.

School trip
The school had 25 pupils stranded in the US in April 2010; they were unable to return home due to the flying ban caused by the Icelandic volcanic ash cloud. The children and four staff went to Florida as part of a physics field trip that was scheduled to last a week but ended up over £15,000 over budget as they had to extend their stay.

Notable alumni
Zöe Lucker — actress
Keith Senior — Leeds Rhinos player
Mona Siddiqui — British Muslim academic
Liam Smith — Shelley FC 1st Team footballer
Mick Walter — actor

References

External links
 Salendine Nook High School's official website
 Ofsted

Schools in Huddersfield
Academies in Kirklees
Secondary schools in Kirklees